Milan Procházka (born April 7, 1977) is a Czech professional ice hockey player. He played with HC Zubr Přerov in the WSM Liga during the 2010–11 Czech Extraliga season.

References

External links

1977 births
Czech ice hockey forwards
HC Karlovy Vary players
Living people
People from Valtice
Sportspeople from the South Moravian Region
HC Dynamo Pardubice players
Orli Znojmo players
MsHK Žilina players
Piráti Chomutov players
HC ZUBR Přerov players
Sportovní Klub Kadaň players
HC Eppan Pirates players
Czech expatriate ice hockey players in Slovakia
Czech expatriate sportspeople in Italy
Expatriate ice hockey players in Italy